Rocky Mountain College is a multi-denominational Christian college in Calgary, Alberta. It was formed in 1992 when Mountain View Bible College (Didsbury, Alberta) merged with Hillcrest Christian College (Medicine Hat, Alberta) and is sponsored by the Canada West District of the Evangelical Missionary Church of Canada.

Rocky Mountain College describes itself as "a learning community of Christians committed to developing students who will be effective agents of spiritual, moral and social transformation everywhere for the glory of God." It offers one-year certificate programs, two-year diploma programs, and three and four-year Bachelor of Arts degrees

References

External links
Rocky Mountain College

Universities and colleges in Calgary
Colleges in Alberta
Association for Biblical Higher Education
Bible colleges
Educational institutions established in 1992
1992 establishments in Alberta